Pale Rider is a 1985 Western film directed by Clint Eastwood.

Pale Rider is commonly associated with the fourth of the Four Horsemen of the Apocalypse in Christian eschatology. The phrase may also refer to: 
Pale Rider (Drapht album), a 2003 hip-hop album by Drapht
Pale Rider (Ricky Ross album), a 2005 rock album by Ricky Ross
Pale Rider: The Spanish Flu of 1918 and How It Changed the World, a 2017 book by Laura Spinney